Murai Mappillai is a 1995 Indian Tamil-language comedy film directed by Sundar C. The film stars newcomers Arun Vijay (known at the time as Arunkumar) and Kirthika, with Rajashree, Manivannan, K. Prabakaran, Goundamani and Senthil playing supporting roles. It was released on 15 December 1995.

Plot
Kai Ezhuthu Gounder and Kai Naattu Gounder are the village's bigwig and best friends. While their children Raja and Indhu hate each other, they are classmates and quarrel continually. In contrast, their fathers want them to get married. Sorna, a dancer, comes to their village to separate the two friends. Raja and Kirthika finally fall in love with each other. Sorna seduces the two friends and creates a conflict between them. In the past, Kai Ezhuthu Gounder and Kai Naattu Gounder attempted to rape Sorna's sister but before it happened, she chose to commit suicide. Since that day, Sorna wanted to take revenge. Raja and Indhu are then distraught by their fathers. Sorna only wanted to punish Kai Ezhuthu Gounder and Kai Naattu Gounder but not the young lovers, so she comes to their rescue. What transpires later forms the crux of the story.

Cast

Arunkumar as Raja
Kirthika as Indhu
Rajashree as Sorna
Manivannan as Kai Ezhuthu Gounder, Raja's father
K. Prabhakaran as Kai Naattu Gounder, Indhu's father
Goundamani as Ramesh
Senthil as Sumesh
Kalaranjini as Raja's mother
Vinodhini
Aasha
Pandu as Hitler, college principal
Suresh Chakravarthy
Halwa Vasu as Pakri
Vichu Vishwanath
Kottai Perumal
Kullamani
Gundu Kalyanam
Karuppu Subbiah
Bonda Mani
Omakuchi Narasimhan
Idichapuli Selvaraj
Jaguar Thangam
Prabhu Solomon (uncredited role)

Production

The film marked the introduction of Arun Vijay, son of actor Vijayakumar into films. The first film Arun Kumar signed was Love Story. But as its music composer, A. R. Rahman, was very busy, producer K. Prabakaran signed him up for Murai Mappillai directed by Sundar C. During the making of the film, Sundar C fell out with the makers, and the venture was finished by Anbalaya Prabhakaran. Prabhu Solomon who went on to direct films like Mynaa (2010) and Kumki (2012) completed the post-production works of the film.

Soundtrack

The film score and the soundtrack were composed by Swararaj, who debuted in Tamil cinema as a music director with this film. The soundtrack, released in 1995, features 7 tracks with lyrics written by Vaali and Bharati Puthran.

References

External links

1995 films
1990s Tamil-language films
Films directed by Sundar C.